"We've Had Enough" is a song by the Chicago-based punk rock band Alkaline Trio, released as the first single from their 2003 album Good Mourning. "We've Had Enough" was released to radio on May 20, 2003. It was the band's first single to chart in the United States, reaching #38 on Billboard's Modern Rock Tracks chart. It also charted in the United Kingdom, reaching #50 on the UK Singles Chart. "We've Had Enough" features backing vocals by Keith Morris, singer of the Circle Jerks and original singer of Black Flag.

The song's music video, directed by Tomorrow's Brightest Minds, depicts the band members as ghosts haunting a family in a house. As the husband unsuccessfully attempts to turn off the radio and television which are broadcasting the song, the wife discovers marked photographs of the band members in life, taken by an unseen person. After the husband witnesses the ghostly figure of a man dragging wrapped bodies through the living room, the two run to check on their son only to find him missing from his bedroom. Directed by the ghosts of the band members, the son leads his parents into the basement where he uses a pickaxe to excavate the skeletons of the murdered members from beneath the concrete floor.

Track listing

The data portion of the enhanced CD consists of the music video for "We've Had Enough".

Personnel

Band
Matt Skiba – guitar, lead vocals
Dan Andriano – bass, backing vocals
Derek Grant – drums

Additional musicians
Keith Morris and Jerry Finn – backing vocals

Production
Joe McGrath – recording engineer, producer
Jerry Finn – co-producer, mix engineer
Christopher Holmes, Jason Gossman, and Robert Reed – assistant engineers
Brian Gardner – mastering

Artwork
Keath Moon – artwork, layout, and design

Charts

References 

Alkaline Trio songs
2003 songs
Songs written by Matt Skiba
Songs written by Dan Andriano
Songs written by Derek Grant (drummer)
Vagrant Records singles
2003 singles